Remington Rolling Block is a family of breech-loading rifles that was produced from the mid-1860s into the early 20th century by E. Remington and Sons (later Remington Arms). The action was extremely strong, and could easily withstand the increased pressure of the new smokeless powders coming into use by the late 1880s.

These rifles were made in a variety of calibers, both rimfire and centerfire, including the 12.17x42 mm rimfire, 12.17x44 mm rimfire and 12.17x44 mm rimmed centerfire Swedish and Norwegian cartridges, .43 Spanish (11.15x58mmR), .50-70, .40-70, .45-70 and later in .22 caliber.  Later models were produced in .30-06 Springfield, 7×57mm Mauser, and 8×50mmR Lebel.

Service rifle

The Remington Rolling Block was developed from the 1863 pattern .50 calibre split breech carbine issued to the US Cavalry during the American Civil War. This earlier weapon was designed by Joseph Rider and Leonard Geiger to fire the same cartridges as the Spencer carbine. The split breech rifle lacked a hammer spur because it self-cocked when the breechblock was opened. In 1865, Rider improved the split breech design to create the rolling-block action which was named the "Remington System". The rolling-block later saw service with George Armstrong Custer's Seventh Cavalry at the Battle of the Little Bighorn, and also in the hands of Native American braves during the Indian Wars.

In 1867, the United Kingdoms of Sweden and Norway was the first military to adopt the rifle as the standard military rifle. Around 250,000 military rifles and carbines and 85,000 civilian rifles in Sweden, were produced under license by Carl Gustafs Stads Gevärsfaktori and Husqvarna Vapenfabriks Aktiebolag, and about 53,000 rifles in Norway by Kongsberg Vaapenfabrik. 

In 12.17×42mmRF and 12.18×44mmRF (two cartridges that were interchangeable), and towards the end of its service life also 8×58mmR Danish Krag centerfire, the rolling-block served as the standard service rifle of the Swedish Army from 1867 to the mid-1890s, when it was replaced by the Swedish Mauser. In Norway it was the standard service rifle from 1867 to the mid-1880s, when it was replaced by the M1884 Jarmann. In .43 Spanish it was the chief service arm of the Spanish Army from 1869–1893, and was used by reserve and militia forces for many years thereafter.  Many rolling-block rifles were used by Argentina before being replaced in 1891 by the new 7.65mm Mauser, and were also widely used by Egypt and Mexico. 

Like Sweden and Norway, Denmark adopted the rifle in 1867 in 11×41,5mmRF (11 mm caliber). Initially the Royal Danish Army bought 40,000 rifles and 1800 carbines in the United States between 1867–1868. Later 31,551 rifles and about 4,600 carbines were made at the government owned rifle factory in Copenhagen. Production was halted in 1888 and the last rifles were decommissioned in 1940. In Danish service it was replaced by the M/1889 Krag–Jørgensen.

Use by the British and French 
The British Empire purchased rolling-blocks to arm the Egyptian Army during the 1870s. These were made in Liège, Belgium, in .43 Egyptian calibre and were issued with a sword bayonet. Rolling-block rifles were used against Muhammad Ahmad's Ansar Dervishes during the Mahdist War,  including at the Battle of Khartoum where General Gordon met his end. Guns with decorative brass Islamic crescents and Arabic inscriptions on the buttstock are not uncommon on the collector's market.

The French acquired 210,000 Egyptian rolling-block rifles to make up for a shortage of the standard-issue Chassepot and Tabatière rifles during the Franco-Prussian War.

During World War I, the British Royal Navy purchased 4,500 rolling-block rifles in 7mm Mauser from Remington's leftover stock after production had ended, issuing them to the crews of minesweepers and Q-ships. In November 1914, production of the rolling-block was resumed, in the form of a French contract for rifles in 8×50mmR Lebel, designated by France as "Fusil Remington modèle 1914". 100,291 such rifles were delivered by 1916, and used to equip rear-line troops.

Civilian use
Along with the Sharps rifle it was one of two rifles probably used more than any other by the buffalo hunters who hunted the American bison herds in the 1870s and 1880s.

Civilian Remington Rolling Block rifles, and later surplus military rifles, became very popular among hunters in Scandinavia, particularly for moose hunting, with ammunition for the rifles being commonly available on the civilian market into the 1920s–1930s.

Military users

 (1867–1940)

 Khedivate of Egypt

 Madagascar

: Compagnie des Carabiniers du Prince

 Persia

 : Katipunan

See also
Rolling-block, the operating principle
Remington Rolling Block M1867, as used by the Swedish and Norwegian Armies.
Springfield model 1870, as used by the United States Navy, produced by Springfield Armory under license.
Springfield model 1871, as used by the United States Army, produced by Springfield Armory under license.

References

External links
 Arming God's Battalions: a Papal States Rolling Block

Early rifles
Rifles of Spain
Rifles of the United States
Remington Arms firearms
Single-shot rifles
Weapons and ammunition introduced in 1867
Guns of the American West
Weapons of the Philippine Army